The Southern Nations, Nationalities, and Peoples' Region (often abbreviated as SNNPR) is a regional state in southwestern Ethiopia. It was formed from the merger of five kililoch, called Regions 7 to 11, following the regional council elections on 21 June 1992. Its government is based in Hawassa.

The SNNPR borders Kenya to the south (including a small part of Lake Turkana), the Ilemi Triangle (a region claimed by Kenya and South Sudan) to the southwest, the South West Ethiopia Region to the west, the Oromia Region to the north and east, and the Sidama Region to the east. The region's major cities and towns include Arba Minch, Sodo, Jinka, Dila, Boditi, Areka, Butajira, Welkite, Bonga, Hosaena and Worabe.

The regional government of the Southern Nations, Nationalities, and Peoples' Region is based in the city of Hawassa. Following the formation of the Sidama Region in June 2020, Hawassa is located outside of the boundaries of the region. The regional government is planning to move to a city within the region's boundaries after two consecutive national electoral cycles. The largest cities in the region are Sodo with the population of 194,977 and Arba Minch with the population of 151,013

Demographics

Based on the 2007 Census conducted by the Central Statistical Agency of Ethiopia (CSA), the SNNPR regional state had an estimated total population of 14,929,548, of whom 7,425,918 were men and 7,503,630 women. 13,433,991 or 89.98% of the population are estimated to be rural inhabitants, while 1,495,557 or 10.02% are urban; this makes the SNNPR Ethiopia's most rural region. With an estimated area of 105,887.18 square kilometers, this region has an estimated density of 141 people per square kilometer. For the entire region 3,110,995 households were counted, which results in an average for the region of 4.8 persons to a household, with urban households having on average 3.9 and rural households 4.9 people. The projected population for 2017 was 19,170,007.

In the previous census, conducted in 1994, the region's population was reported to be 10,377,028 of whom 5,161,787 were men and 5,215,241 were women. At the time of the census, the rural population of the Region accounted for 93.2% of the total population. Semien Omo, Wolayita, and Gurage were the three zones with the highest population. The population is concentrated mostly in eastern, northern and central part of the SNNPR while the western and southern part of the region is sparsely populated.

The SNNPR Water Resources Bureau announced that as of the fiscal year ending in 2006, they had increased the area of the region that had access to drinkable water to 54% from 10 to 15% 15 years ago. In August 2008, the head of public relations for the Bureau, Abdulkerim Nesru, announced that 94 million birr had been spent to further increase the availability of drinkable water in the region from 58% in the previous year to 63.6%. Priority was given to certain zones, such as Sidama, Welayta and Gurage, as well as the Alaba special woreda and several resettlement areas.

Values for other reported common indicators of the standard of living for the SNNPR  include the following: 10.7% of the inhabitants fall into the lowest wealth quintile; adult literacy for men is 57% and for women 22.4%; and the Regional infant mortality rate is 85 infant deaths per 1,000 live births, which is greater than the nationwide average of 77; at least half of these deaths occurred in the infants’ first month of life.

Religion

Ethnicities
The SNNPR, being an amalgam of the main homelands of numerous ethnicities, contains over 45 indigenous ethnic groups.

All ethnicities in region

The ethnicities native to the SNNPR, with percentages of the population as reported in the 2007 national census and organized by linguistic grouping, include:

Languages
The 2007 census reported that the predominantly spoken mother tongue languages include Sidama (19.59%), Welayta (10.48%), Hadiya (8%), Gurage languages (7.13%), Gamo (6.9%), Kafa (5.36%) and Amharic (4.10%). Other languages spoken in the State include Kambaata, Mello, Goffa, Gedeo and Dima; because of the relatively few number of speakers of most of the languages in the region, the working language of the state is Amharic (the most widely spoken language in Ethiopia and formerly the only official language).

The 1994 census reported that the predominantly spoken languages include Sidamigna (18%), Guragigna (14.72%), Welayta (11.53%), Hadiyigna (8.53%), Keffigna (5.22%), and Kembatigna (4.35%). Other languages spoken in the State include Gamoigna, Mello, Goffa, and Gedeo.

Amharic is still the working language although most pupils get eight years of primary education in their home language and all secondary and further education is in English.

Agriculture

The CSA reported that for 2004–2005 100,338 tons of coffee were produced in the SNNPR, based on inspection records from the Ethiopian Coffee and Tea authority. This represents 44.2% of the total production in Ethiopia.

Farmers in the Region had an estimated total 7,938,490 head of cattle (representing 20.5% of Ethiopia's total cattle), 3,270,200 sheep (18.8%), 2,289,970 goats (17.6%), 298,720 horses (19.7%), 63,460 mules (43.1%), 278,440 asses (11.1%), 6,586,140 poultry of all species (21.3%), and 726,960 beehives (16.7%).

Enset is a major indigenous local crop in the SNNPR.

List of Chief Administrators 

Abate Kisho (SEPDM), 1992–2001
Hailemariam Desalegn, 12 November 2001 – March 2006
Shiferaw Shigute (SEPDM), March 2006 – July 2013
Dessie Dalke, July 2013 – 2018
Million Mathiwos, 2018 – 2019
Erstu Yirdaw, August 31, 2019 – present

Administrative zones
The following table shows administrative zones and special woredas (an administrative subdivision which is similar to an autonomous area is based on information from 2022; the list of second administrative level bodies maintained by the United Nations Geographic Information Working Group dates from 2002.

Former zones
 Keficho Shekicho Zone
 North Omo Zone

Peace and stability

See also
 List of districts in the Southern Nations, Nationalities, and Peoples' Region

References

External links

 
 Map of Southern Nations, Nationalities, and Peoples' Region at UN-OCHA (PDF file)
 Map of Southern Nations, Nationalities and Peoples' Region at DPPA of Ethiopia (PDF file)
 Ethiopia's Vanishing Tribes slideshow by Life magazine

 
1994 establishments in Ethiopia
Ethiopian Highlands
Regions of Ethiopia
States and territories established in 1992